Dilshod Mukhtarov (born 4 January 1975) is an Uzbekistani sport shooter. Mukhtarov made his official debut at the 2000 Summer Olympics in Sydney, where he finished ninth in the men's 10 m air pistol, with a score of 379 points, tying his position with Russia's Vladimir Goncharov. He also reached the final of the men's 50 m pistol event, but finished only in fifth place by two tenths of a point behind Goncharov, for a total score of 662.0.

Mukhtarov made a comeback from his eight-year absence at the 2008 Summer Olympics in Beijing, where he competed for the second time in two pistol shooting events. He placed fifteenth out of forty-eight shooters in the men's 10 m air pistol, with a total score of 580 points. Three days later, Mukhtarov competed for his second event, 50 m rifle pistol, where he was able to fire 10 shots each in six attempts, for a total score of 549 points, finishing only in thirty-first place.

References

External links
NBC Olympics Profile

Uzbekistani male sport shooters
Living people
Olympic shooters of Uzbekistan
Shooters at the 2000 Summer Olympics
Shooters at the 2008 Summer Olympics
Sportspeople from Tashkent
1975 births
Asian Games medalists in shooting
Shooters at the 1998 Asian Games
Shooters at the 2002 Asian Games
Shooters at the 2006 Asian Games
Asian Games silver medalists for Uzbekistan
Medalists at the 1998 Asian Games
21st-century Uzbekistani people